Superior Essex is the parent brand of Essex Furukawa Magnet Wire, Superior Essex Communications, and Essex Brownell. It has over 3,000 employees in 11 countries. Essex is among the leading global manufacturers of magnet wire. It is active in the electrification of the automotive, energy, and industrial sectors.

Brands

Essex Furukawa Magnet Wire  

Founded in 1930, is a global provider of magnet wire, used by original equipment manufacturers (OEMs) as well as manufacturers in the automotive, energy, and industrial sectors. In 2020, a global joint venture between Essex Magnet Wire and Furukawa Electric Co., Ltd. was formed and operates under Essex Furukawa Magnet Wire.

Superior Essex Communications 

Founded in 1998, is a manufacturer and supplier of communications cable in North America. It is active in the development of power over Ethernet applications, intelligent buildings and smart cities, and 5G Fiber infrastructure as part of the Cisco Digital Ceiling ecosystem. In 2021, Superior Essex Communications announced its appointment as a corporate board member of the Continental Automated Buildings Association (CABA).

Essex Brownell
Is a distributor of lead wire, motors, drives, electrical and electronic insulation, tapes, repair parts, and shop and test equipment. Essex Brownell operates 16 facilities in the United States, Mexico and Canada.

History
Essex Wire Corporation was founded in 1930 and was an original equipment manufacturer. It operated 44 plants in North America by 1965 and had sales of $355 million.

Superior Cable came into existence in 1954 and had sales passing $500 million in 1997.

In April 1999, Superior Essex was formed by a merger of Essex Wire Corporation and Superior Cable.

In 2008, the Korean LS Group acquired Superior Essex for roughly $900 million to extend its reach into the North American and European market.

Superior Essex's PowerWise cable won a 2018 Top Product of the Year Award for its 4PPoE innovation, and it was also the first cable manufacturer to ever be awarded the International Living Future Institute's Living Product Challenge certification for its Category 6+ low smoke, halogen free (LSHF) cable.

Locations

Americas 

 United States
 Canada
 Mexico

Europe 

 France
 Germany
 Italy
 Serbia
 United Kingdom

Asia 
 China
 Malaysia
 Japan

References

External links
Superior Essex homepage

Wire and cable manufacturers
American companies established in 1999
Manufacturing companies of the United States